Shi Zhe (born 29 June 1993) is a Chinese footballer currently playing as a versatile forward, winger or full-back for Suzhou Dongwu.

Club career
Shi Zhe would start his professional football career when he was promoted to the senior team of his local club Yanbian Changbai Tiger in the 2013 China League One season. The following season he would join Chongqing Dangdai and despite being part of the squad that went on to win the division title and promotion to the top tier he was loaned out to Qingdao Huanghai. At Qingdao he would make his debut in a league game on 14 March 2015 against Hunan Billows F.C. that ended in a 0-0 draw. This would be followed by his first goal for the club on 5 April 2015 against Jiangxi Liansheng F.C. in a league game that ended in a 2-1 victory. On 26 February he would make his loan move to Qingdao permanent. He would become an integral member of the team that would win the 2019 China League One division and promotion into the top tier.

Career statistics

Honours

Club
Chongqing Dangdai
China League One: 2014

Qingdao Huanghai
China League One: 2019

References

External links

1993 births
Living people
Chinese footballers
Association football forwards
China League One players
Chinese Super League players
Yanbian Funde F.C. players
Chongqing Liangjiang Athletic F.C. players
Qingdao F.C. players
People from Yanbian